Five Forty Aviation Ltd, trading as Fly540, is a low-cost airline which commenced operations in 2006 and is based in Nairobi, Kenya, operating both passenger and cargo services. The airline had two subsidiary airlines, Fly540 Ghana (suspended in May 2014 and since sold) and Fly540 Angola (suspended in May 2014), but has since focused its business expansion plans on East Africa.  The company slogan was Your Local Airline.

History

Initial domestic services
Fly540 started operations between Nairobi and Mombasa on November 24, 2006. The airline's name refers to its price of KSh5,540 per adult return fare between the above-mentioned cities.

Lonrho Africa was a major investor in the company, paying US $1.5 million for a 49% stake.

Passenger numbers rose by 93% to 171,160 in the year ended 30 September 2008, from 88,571 in 2007. At the same time, the load factor amounted to 63%, down from 65.8% in 2007.

Pan-African ambitions 

The original scheduled flights included freight and passenger services between Nairobi and Mombasa, while Kisumu became a destination in January 2007. Daily flights on the Nairobi-Malindi-Lamu route were added to its domestic services in February 2007.

International operations commenced in October 2007 with flights to Juba in South Sudan and Goma in the Democratic Republic of the Congo; Entebbe in Uganda in February 2008. Additionally  Fly540 Tanzania launched direct flights between  Dar es Salaam and Mwanza, on the western shores of Lake Victoria. Initially the company operated 11 flights a week and it was hoped that in time its Fokker 28 aircraft, which carried 28 people, would be upgraded to a 50-seater CRJ 100.

Investment by Fastjet
In June 2012 Fly540 was sold for $85.7 million (Sh7.3 billion) to British investment firm Rubicon Diversified Investments (now Fastjet Plc ), who purchased the airline from Lonrho group. Rubicon said it had chosen to acquire Fly540 as its platform for the launch of a budget airline in Africa, to be modelled on Europe's second largest low-cost carrier EasyJet.

The first flights were transferred to the new airline, Fastjet, from 29 November 2012.  These were two domestic routes in Tanzania; it had been expected that all Fly540 flights would quickly be transferred to Fastjet, in turn, as the various arrangements and permissions required for each route are agreed.

Following the acquisition of Lonrho's 49% interest in Five Forty Aviation Kenya Ltd, and a further 49.98% economic interest in the company approved at a Fastjet General meeting on 29 June 2012 and completed on 2 July 2012, it became apparent that the vendor did not consider the additional acquisition had completed. The dispute led to legal claims by both parties over the ownership and other matters. A Memorandum of Understanding was reached on 23 April 2013 where both parties agreed to stop legal proceedings against each other because Fastjet considered they did not have control or significant influence. As of 1 July 2014, a settlement was agreed between Fastjet and Don Smith [CEO] in which Fastjet transferred all shares in Five Forty Aviation Kenya LTD to Don Smith and Fastjet relinquished any further interest in Five Forty Aviation Ltd. The Five Forty brand name is for sole use of Five Forty Aviation Kenya Ltd.

Suspension
The airline's operations in Kenya were suspended in November 2022 by the country's  Competition Authority following complaints over false advertising, short notice before cancellation of flights, and delayed refunds.

Corporate affairs
Since the acquisition of Lonrho (BVI) Ltd's interest on 29 June 2012, Five Forty Aviation Ltd is now 100% privately owned.

Destinations 

As of February 2016, Fly540 flies to the following destinations.

Fleet

Current fleet
The Fly540 fleet consists of the following aircraft (as of August 2019):

Fleet development
In January 2008, the company signed a US$150 million contract for eight ATR 72-500s to be delivered in 2008 and 2009. These orders have since been cancelled
 In April 2014, Fastjet announced that two ATRs and both DC-9 aircraft were to be withdrawn from service: the ATRs are to be sold, and the DC-9s are to be returned to their lessors.

Former fleet
The airline previously operated the following aircraft (as of August 2017):
 2 Bombardier CRJ100ER

See also
 List of airlines of Kenya

References

External links 

 

Airlines of Kenya
Airlines established in 2006
Low-cost carriers
Kenyan companies established in 2006